Ilkley Town Association Football Club is a football club based in Ilkley, England.

History
Ilkley Town were formed in the 1960s, initially competing in the Wharfedale League. In the early 1990s, the club dissolved due to sports such as rugby, hockey, and cricket having better facilities in Ilkley. In 1994, Ilkley were founded, joining the Harrogate and District Football League winning the Division 3 League and Cup double in the first season, before securing a second straight promotion the following season. In 2004, the club joined the West Yorkshire League, changing the name of the club to Ilkley Town a year later. In 2021, the club was admitted into the North West Counties League Division One North. Ilkley Town entered the FA Vase for the first time in 2021–22.

Ground
The club currently play at the MPM Stadium at the Ben Rhydding Sports Club in Ilkley. In 2017, a 4G pitch was installed at the ground.

References

Ilkley
Association football clubs established in 1995
1995 establishments in England
Football clubs in England
Football clubs in West Yorkshire
Harrogate and District Football League
West Yorkshire Association Football League
North West Counties Football League clubs